A Stab in the Dark is a 1999 English language Ghanaian movie produced by Bam Nemesia, Ltd. and directed by Veronica Quarshie. It was a financial and critical success, winning Best Film at the Ghana Movie Awards in 2000.

Plot
A lady is betrayed when her best friend, starts a relationship with her father after the family helps her by taking her in.

This five film series (A Stab in the Dark 1,2, Ripples: A Stab in Dark 3, Ripples 2, and Ripples 3) follows the lives of young women in domestic dramas and represents a variation of the social issues in drama.

In A Stab in the Dark, the main character, Effe, is a pretty young woman who prefers dating much older, usually married men. Effe leaves her home to escape her mother’s criticism of her behavior and stays with her friend’s family.

While at her friend Kate’s house, Effe has an affair with Kate’s father and ruins the dynamics of that family.

Eventually, in the fifth film, Effe decides to turn her life around and instead of ruining families and marriages, helps save a marriage and regains her friendship with Kate.

Cast 

Psalm Adjeteyfio
Pascaline Edwards
Edinam Atatsi
Kwame Owusu-Ansah
Naana Hayford
Mawuli Semevo
Grace Omaboe
Agnes Dapaah
Nat Banini
Wendy Nortey
Henry Nartey
Abeiku Nyame (Jagger Pee)
Abeiku Acquah
Yvonne Boakye

Sequels
A Stab in the Dark is the first in a series of five short films all directed by Veronica Quarshie and released between 1999 and 2003.
A Stab in the Dark (1999)
A Stab in the Dark 2 (2000)
Ripples: A Stab in the Dark 3 (2000)
Ripples 2 (2000)
Rage: Ripples 3 (2003)

Analysis 
A Stab in the Dark and its sequels are noted for focusing on male infidelity as a source of familial conflict, a plot device not commonly used in Ghanaian and Nigerian cinema.

Reception 
A Stab in the Dark and its sequels are considered to be among Quarshie's best and most significant work. A Stab in the Dark was financially successful and won several awards, including Best FIlm at the Ghana Movie Awards in 2000.

Further reading 
 Aveh, Michael Africanus. "Culture, Identity, Nationalism and the African Cinema: The Dream and Current Challenges." Diss. University of Ghana Legon, Ghana, 2011. Print.

References

English-language Ghanaian films
1999 films
1990s English-language films